Rhagonycha nigriceps is a species of soldier beetles belonging to the family Cantharidae, subfamily Cantharinae.

This beetle is mainly present in Austria, Czech Republic, France, Germany, Italy,  Spain, Switzerland, and in the eastern Palearctic realm

The adults grow up to a centimetre. They are distinguished for the orange-brown colour of elytra, the red pronotum and black head (hence the specific name). This quite common beetle is active during the daylight hours, when it can be easily found on Apiaceae or Asteraceae species.

External links
 Biolib
 Fauna Europaea

Cantharidae
Beetles of Europe
Beetles described in 1838
Taxa named by Joseph Waltl